Lewellen is a surname. Notable people with the surname include:

Hope Lewellen (born 1967), American Paralympic volleyball player
John M. Lewellen (1930–2017), American politician
Jonathan Lewellen, American economist
Royce R. Lewellen, American judge
Ted C. Lewellen (1940–2006), American anthropologist
Verne Lewellen (1901–1980), American football player and executive
Wayne Lewellen (1944–2009), American film distribution executive and producer 
Wilhelmina Lewellen (born 1937), American politician

See also
Luellen, another surname